is a Japanese professional footballer who plays for Belgian club Union SG, on loan from Kashima Antlers.

Career
Machida joined J1 League club Kashima Antlers in 2016. On 25 May, he debuted in J.League Cup, in a match against Júbilo Iwata.

Club statistics

References

External links

Profile at Kashima Antlers

1997 births
Living people
Association football people from Ibaraki Prefecture
Japanese footballers
J1 League players
Kashima Antlers players
Royale Union Saint-Gilloise players
Association football defenders
Footballers at the 2020 Summer Olympics
Olympic footballers of Japan
Japanese expatriate footballers
Expatriate footballers in Belgium
Japanese expatriate sportspeople in Belgium